Larnook is a suburb of City of Lismore, New South Wales. 

Larnook is 23 km northwest of Lismore. It has its own Bush Fire Brigade. The Rock Valley Hall has been nominated as a Safe Place of last resort during a bush fire emergency. The median property price in 2017 was $165,000

References

Populated places in New South Wales